Algérois is a cultural region of the Maghreb, located in north-central Algeria.

Geography
The region corresponds roughly to the following wilayas: 
Algiers Province
Blida  Province
Médéa  Province
Boumerdès Province
Tipaza Province
Aïn Defla Province
Chlef Province

The capital of the region is the city of Algiers.

See also

References 

Cultural regions of Algeria
Geography of Algiers Province
Algiers   
Geography of Aïn Defla Province
Geography of Béjaïa Province
Geography of Blida Province
Geography of Boumerdès Province
Geography of Médéa Province
Geography of Tipaza Province